The Princeton Tigers men's soccer team is an intercollegiate varsity sports team of Princeton University. The team is a member of the Ivy League of the National Collegiate Athletic Association. The team is one of the oldest active soccer clubs in the United States, playing their first recorded match in 1869.  The team was once coached by former U.S. national team coach and former Swansea City manager, Bob Bradley.

Roster

Notable alumni 

 Matt Behncke
 Bob Bradley
 Antoine Hoppenot
 Jesse Marsch

References

External links
 

 
1869 establishments in New Jersey
Soccer clubs in New Jersey
Association football clubs established in 1869